Bellville Stadium is a multi-use stadium in Bellville, South Africa.  It is currently used mostly for football matches and is the home stadium of Vasco Da Gama.

Soccer venues in South Africa
Sports venues in Cape Town